The Polish minority in Belarus numbers officially 288,000 according to 2019 census. However, according to the Ministry of Foreign Affairs of Poland the number is as high as 1,100,000. It forms the second largest ethnic minority in the country after the Russians, at around 3.1% of the total population. An estimated 205,200 Belarusian Poles live in large agglomerations and 82,493 in smaller settlements, with the number of women exceeding the number of men by 33,905. Some estimates by Polish non-governmental sources in the U.S. are higher, citing the previous poll held in 1989 under the Soviet authorities with 413,000 Poles recorded.

Since the dissolution of the Soviet Union and the emergence of sovereign Republic of Belarus, the situation of the Polish minority has been steadily improving. The politics of Sovietization pursued by decades of indoctrination, went down in history. Poles in Belarus began re-establishing the Polish language schools and their legal right of participating in the religious life. However, the attitude of new authorities to Polish minority are not very consistent. The new laws are insufficient, and the local levels of Belarusian government are largely unwilling to accept the aspirations of their own ethnic Poles, making them into new targets for state-sanctioned intolerance, according to 2005 report by The Economist.

History

Polish ethnic and cultural presence in modern Belarus are an intricate part of its history. The lands of modern Belarus are the birthplace of important Polish historical figures, such as the writer Mickiewicz or scientist Domejko among others. The proto-Belarusian language, called Ruthenian or Old Belarusian was protected by law in the Polish–Lithuanian Commonwealth and used as local vernacular, while both Polish and Latin languages were the lingua franca of the throne. "As the 16th century drew to a close" – wrote Andrew Savchenko about the local nobles, they had to contend with "an increasingly stark choice: to strengthen their ties with Poland or to suffer disastrous military defeat and subjugation" by the Russian Empire, thus leading to their 'voluntary' "Polonization". After the Napoleonic Wars, Russia annexed the territories of the former Grand Duchy of Lithuania as its North-Western Territory. Throughout the 19th century, a majority of the gentry, which comprised about 10% of the population, continued to identify as culturally Polish. But "the mass of unassuming peasants", ethnically Lithuanian or Belarusian, "was subjected to active Russification" by the Tsarist authorities including the abolition of the Uniate Church created by the Union of Brest, a uniquely Belarusian institution and a cornerstone of the Belarusian nation.

The territories of the Russian Empire consisting of modern Belarus were divided in 1921 between Poland and the Russian Soviet Federative Socialist Republic at the Treaty of Riga, thus ending the Polish-Soviet War. Thousands of Poles settled in the area following the peace treaty. In the elections of November 1922, a Belarusian party (in the Blok Mniejszości Narodowych coalition) obtained 14 seats in the Polish parliament (11 of them in the lower chamber, Sejm). In 1923, a new regulation was passed allowing for the Belarusian language to be used officially both in courts and in schools. Obligatory teaching of the Belarusian language was introduced in all Polish gymnasia in areas inhabited by Belarusians in 1927. 

Across the border, in the Belarusian SSR, Minsk was home to Polish community organizations and a Polish-speaking national theatre of Belarus. In addition, a Polish Autonomous District, Dzierżyńszczyzna, was proclaimed on Soviet territory. However, in East Belarus the Soviet authorities liquidated most Polish organizations in the early 1930s.

The "Polish operation" of the NKVD
In 1937–1938, the Soviet Byelorussia witnessed the "Polish Operation" of the NKVD. The state-sanctioned campaign of mass-murder which took place approximately from August 25, 1937 to November 15, 1938, according to archives of the Soviet NKVD, resulted in the killing of 111,091 ethnic Poles (mostly men). Additional 28,744 were sentenced to death-ridden labor camps; amounting to 139,835 Polish victims across the country (10% of the officially persecuted persons during the entire Yezhovshchina period, with confirming NKVD documents). About 17% of the total number of victims came from Byelorussia, among them, thousands of peasants, railway workers, industrial labourers, engineers and similar others, resulting in near collapse of its economy. In a typical Stalinist fashion, the murdered Polish families were accused of "anti-Soviet" activities and state terrorism.

1939 invasion of Poland
Following the Nazi–Soviet Invasion of Poland in 1939, the Polish anti-German resistance movement Armia Krajowa was actively operating on the territory of modern Belarus, although many ethnic Belarusians also actively participated in the movement. Soon after the Soviet invasion of Poland, Poland was divided between Germany and the Soviet Union in accordance with the Molotov–Ribbentrop Pact. The eastern part was incorporated into the USSR following staged elections. Part of this area (West Belarus) was added to the Soviet republic of Belarus.
 

In their attack, the Red Army overrun 52.1% of territory of interwar Poland with over 13,700,000 inhabitants. The Soviet occupation zone included also 336,000 new refugees who escaped from Polish lands invaded by Germany, numbering at around 198,000. Spreading terror throughout the region, the Soviet secret police (NKVD) accompanying the Red Army massacred Polish prisoners of war, and in less than two years, deported up to 1.5 million ethnic Poles to Siberia including Poles and Polish Jews from West Belarus. Twenty-one months after the Soviet invasion of Poland, during the German Operation Barbarossa of June 1941, West Belarus was overrun again by the Wehrmacht followed closely behind by Einsatzgruppen and the mass executions of Polish Jews commenced.

In 1945, the Big Three, Great Britain, the United States and the Soviet Union, established new borders for Poland. The Polish population was soon forcibly resettled as part of the Soviet-Polish population exchange. Many inhabitants of Belarus who identified themselves as Poles were allowed to go back to Poland. In exchange, several thousands of Belarusians from parts of the former Belastok Voblast were resettled to Belarus. 

The remaining Polish minority in Belarus was significantly discriminated against during the times of the Soviet Union. Until 1949 all Polish language schools were replaced with the Russian, and not even a single one remained due to continuing policies of Sovietization. All Polish organizations and social clubs were liquidated. Incidentally, the Poles were the only ethnic group in Belorussian SSR whose existence was denied by communist administration. The situation of the Polish minority started to improve only in the later years of the Soviet Union prior to its dissolution, but faced difficulties from the government of Alexander Lukashenko.

Current situation

According to the 2019 census Polish minority in Belarus numbers officially about 287,693. After the Russian minority, Poles certainly form the second largest minority group in Belarus. The majority of Poles live in the Western regions including 223,119 in the Grodno oblast. Poles consist majority in Sapotskin and its surroundings, as well as in Voranava District. The largest Polish organization in Belarus is the Union of Poles in Belarus (Związek Polaków na Białorusi), with over 20,000 members.

As Poland supports the pro-democracy opposition in Belarus, Polish-Belarusian relations are poor, and representatives of the Polish minority in Belarus often complain about various repressions, such as the jailing for 15 days of the former head of the Union of Poles, Tadeusz Gawin. He was sentenced on 2 August 2005 for arranging a meeting between a visiting deputy speaker of the Polish parliament, Donald Tusk, and the ethnic Polish activists including Veslaw Kewlyak, also sentenced for 15 days. The Lukashenko government launched a campaign against the Polish ethnic minority claiming that they were trying to destabilise the balance of power, and that the Polish minority is a fifth column (see, earlier Soviet proclamations). In May and June of that year a Polish diplomat was expelled, a Polish-language newspaper was closed and the democratically elected leadership of a local Polish organisation, the Union of Poles in Belarus (UPB), had their own nominees forcibly replaced by those sympathetic to Lukashenko.

The introduction of the Karta Polaka (Polish Charter) in 2007 confirming Polish heritage of individuals who cannot obtain dual citizenship in their own countries, enabled many thousands of inhabitants of Belarus to formally declare their Polish identity for the Ministry of Foreign Affairs of Poland. The introduction caused protests from Belarusian officials.

Poles in Belarus have an unusual linguistic situation. A slight majority use Belarusian, while a majority of ethnic Belarusians actually use Russian. This unusual situation arose because the Poles in Belarus live mostly in the Belarusian-speaking parts of the country, whereas Russian now dominates in Minsk and most of eastern Belarus. Very few Belarusian Poles use Polish in everyday life.

See also

Population exchange between Poland and Soviet Belarus in the aftermath of World War II
 Belarusian minority in Poland
 Poles in Lithuania
 Poles in the former Soviet Union

References

External links
 Various links and information about Polish organization on Belarus
 News Articles about the Polish Community in Belarus 
  News website
  Various articles and legal documents related to Polish minority in Belarus
  Polacy na Białorusi: Liczebność i rozmieszczenie ludności polskiej według ostatnich spisów powszechnych 
 Andrzej Tichomirow, Polish National Minority in Belarus as a Research Problem, Belarusian Review Working Paper, #1, October 2014

Ethnic groups in Belarus
Belarus
Belarus–Poland relations